Rev Up is the debut studio album by The Revillos, following the split of the original Rezillos line-up and formation of the new, similarly-titled band. It was released in 1980 by record labels Dindisc and Snatzo Recordi. The title track "Rev Up" was used in the 1984 film Sixteen Candles.

Track listing
"Secret of the Shadow"
"Rev Up"
"The Rock-a-Boom"
"Voodoo"
"Bobby Come Back to Me"
"Scuba Boy Bop"
"Yeah Yeah"
"Hungry for Love"
"Juke Box Sound"
"On the Beach"
"Cool Jerk"
"Hippy Hippy Sheik"
"Motorbike Beat"

References

External links 
 

1980 debut albums
Punk rock albums by Scottish artists
New wave albums by Scottish artists